Kimberly Williamson (born 2 October 1993) is a Jamaican athlete specialising in the high jump. She represented her country in the high jump at the 2017 and 2022 World Athletics Championships, finishing 11th in the latter.

Her personal bests in the event are 1.93 metres outdoors (Nashville 2022) and 1.88 metres indoors (Des Moines 2017).

International competitions

References

1993 births
Living people
Jamaican female high jumpers
World Athletics Championships athletes for Jamaica
Athletes (track and field) at the 2014 Commonwealth Games
Athletes (track and field) at the 2015 Pan American Games
Athletes (track and field) at the 2019 Pan American Games
People from Clarendon Parish, Jamaica
Pan American Games bronze medalists for Jamaica
Pan American Games medalists in athletics (track and field)
Central Arizona Vaqueros women's track and field athletes
Kansas State Wildcats women's track and field athletes
Medalists at the 2019 Pan American Games
Commonwealth Games competitors for Jamaica
20th-century Jamaican women
21st-century Jamaican women
Athletes (track and field) at the 2022 Commonwealth Games
Commonwealth Games bronze medallists for Jamaica
Commonwealth Games medallists in athletics
Medallists at the 2022 Commonwealth Games